Arthur Martin Deremer (December 16, 1917 – March 14, 2001) was an American football player and coach. He played for one year for the Brooklyn Dodgers of the National Football League (NFL), in 1942, before becoming the head football coach at the Charlotte Center for the University of North Carolina for one season, in 1946.

Head coaching record

References

External links
 

1917 births
2001 deaths
American football centers
Brooklyn Dodgers (NFL) players
Charlotte 49ers football coaches
Niagara Purple Eagles football players
Coaches of American football from Pennsylvania
Players of American football from Pittsburgh